Geonoma maxima is a species of palm tree native to South America.

References

maxima
Trees of Peru
Trees of Colombia
Trees of Brazil
Trees of Venezuela
Trees of Ecuador
Trees of Suriname
Trees of French Guiana
Trees of Guyana
Trees of Bolivia